The Proterocameroceratidae were the first of the Endocerida. They began early in the Ordovician with Proendoceras or similar genus which had developed endocones, replacing the diaphragms of the ellesmerocerid ancestor.

Proterocameroceratids are long, straight or gently curved with a generally narrow siphuncle along the ventral margin. Septal necks are short, never quite reaching the previous septum and may vary in length ontogenically within a species. Connecting rings are thick and layered. Endocones are simple, especially in early forms but may be complex with secondary structures in later forms.

The Proterocameroceratidae gave rise to the Piloceratidae early on, and later to the Manchuroceratidae and Chihlioceratidae, from which the Allotrioceratidae are derived, and later yet possibly to the Emmonsoceratidae and Najaceratidae. The Piloceratidae in turn may have given rise to the Endoceratidae although a proterocameroceratid ancestor remains possible.
Proterocameroceratids were probably mobile bottom predators that moved from place to place over the sea floor in search of prey or escape. Their shell was on one hand a carry over from some Cambrian monoplacophoran ancestor, passed on through previous orders, and on the other both a hydrodynamic facilitator and protection. But the shells of nautiloids, such as the proterocameroceratids was also an impediment to true squidlike or fishlike swimming. They could not have had fins for propulsion or steering, only the hyponome for spontaneous jet mobility and their tentacles by which to crawl across the sea floor and to grasp at things. The diagnostic endocones in the early part of the siphuncle balanced the weight of the animal living at the front of the shell.

The Proterocameroceratidae ultimately suffered the extinction at the end of the Ordovician, but not before having given rise to a variety of endocerid families. They remain a subject of interesting research.

Genera

Anthoceras
Campendoceras
Clitendoceras
Cotteroceras
Escharendoceras
Exoclitendoceras
Lobendoceras
Lobosiphon
Manitouoceras
Mccluskiceras
Mcqueenoceras
Meniscoceras
Mysticoceras
Oderoceras
Paraendoceras
Phragmosiphon
Platysiphon
Pliendoceras
Proendoceras
Proterocameroceras
Protocyptendoceras
Retroclitendoceras
Stenosiphon

References

Flower, R. H. 1955, Status of Endoceroid Classification; Jour. Paleon. V 29. n.3 May 1955pp 327–370.
 —   1958, Some Chazyan and Mohawkian Endoceratida, Jour Paleon V 32, n 2,May 1858, pp 433–458.
 —  1976, Ordovician Cephalopod Faunas and Their Role in Correlation, pp 531–537 in The Ordovician System: Proceedings of a Paleontological Association  Symposium;  Univ of Wales and Welsh Nat’l Mus Press.
Teichert, Curt 1964, Proterocameroceratidae in the Treatise on Invertebrate Paleontology, VolK pp K166 -k170;    Geol Soc of America and University of Kansas Press

Nautiloids
Ordovician cephalopods
Ordovician first appearances
Late Ordovician extinctions
Prehistoric nautiloid families